The Canadian Army Film and Photo Unit (CFPU) was a Canadian Army unit founded in 1941 in order to document military operations during World War II. It was the last unit of its kind to be founded by the Allied armies. Among the campaigns which it recorded were the invasion of Sicily, the D-Day Landings, the liberation of Paris and the Elbe River link-up of the Allied armies, known as 'Elbe Day'.

History

The first official Canadian army photographer was Lieutenant Laurie Audrain of Winnipeg; he was appointed on June 25, 1940. However, it was soon recognized that a dedicated photographic unit was necessary. The CFPU was formed on June 19, 1941 under the command of Captain William Abell of Winnipeg. By the end of World War II, fifty nine Canadian photographers and cameramen had been involved in combat operations in Europe. Of these, six were killed and eighteen were wounded.

The CFPU was staffed by enlisted men and women. Its objectives were to film Canadian troops in action and supply the Department of National Defence, and also media outlets, with theatrical newsreels and still photographs. It was the first Allied unit to provide film of the assault waves landing in Sicily and Normandy, the first to get still pictures from Normandy onto the front pages of the world press, and the only one to produce colour pictures of Operation Overlord.

Among its members were:
 Charles Roos, who was the first Allied cameraman ashore on D-Day. Roos' film of Canadian soldiers disembarking under fire on Juno Beach is among the most iconic footage of the D-Day Landings. 
 Al Calder, who parachuted over the Rhine during Operation Market Garden, (General Montgomery's bold but ultimately unsuccessful attempt to bring the war to an end by Christmas 1944).
 Lieutenant Ken Bell, who landed on Juno Beach on D-Day with The Highland Light Infantry of Canada, and shot the only surviving colour footage of D-Day.
 Llewellyn Weekes, who shot the liberation of Paris.
 Sergeant D.W. Grant, who on D-Day filmed approximately two minutes of motion picture footage of soldiers of The North Shore Regiment landing at Bernières-sur-Mer. The film was quickly sent to England and cleared for distribution by news outlets.

Members of the CFPU were often in the front line, sometimes even ahead of it. During the liberation of Dieppe in 1944, as the Manitoba Dragoons awaited orders to advance, members of the CFPU including Ken Bell and Brian O'Regan were the first Allied servicemen to enter the town.

In April 1945 the journalist Lionel Shapiro wrote in Maclean's magazine:
"CFPU men were in the thick of every battle, often moving with the most forward units, on a few occasions positioning themselves at a vantage point in no-man's land in anticipation of a clash."

Modern era and legacy
Today, Ken Bell's war photographs - taken with a Rolleiflex camera - are housed by the Library and Archives Canada., in Ottawa. After the war, Bell published a number of photographic memoirs of his experiences with the CFPU, including Curtain Call, published in 1953, and Not in Vain, published in 1973.

In 2005, a one-hour documentary titled Shooters was made by James O'Regan, son of CFPU member Brian O'Regan, showing the history of the CFPU and broadcast on the CBC. The eBook, Camera Commandos, by Brian O'Regan, was also published.

Gallery

See also
 Juno Beach
 Ken Bell
 ECPAD

References

Notes

Bibliography

 Bell, Ken. Not in Vain. Toronto: University of Toronto Press, 1973. .
 Conlin, Dan. War Through the Lens: the Canadian Army Film and Photo Unit 1941-1945. Niagara Falls, Ontario: Seraphim Editions, 2015. .
 O'Regan, Brian. Camera Commandos and Reminiscences of D-Day Normandy. E Book, 2007, 
 O'Regan, Brian. Shooters, documentary film, written produced and directed by James O'Regan, 2005.

External links
Canadian Film and Photo Website 
Link to James O'Regan's documentary website Retrieved May 6, 2010
Website dedicated to the Canadian Army Film and Photo Unit Retrieved May 6, 2010

Military history of Canada during World War II
Military units and formations of Canada in World War II